Hans Hohloch (23 November 1900 – 13 February 1976) was a German architect. His work was part of the architecture event in the art competition at the 1928 Summer Olympics.

References

1900 births
1976 deaths
20th-century German architects
Olympic competitors in art competitions
People from Horgen District